The Agârbiciu is a left tributary of the Someșul Cald in Romania. It discharges into the Someșul Cald Reservoir near the village Someșu Cald.

References

Rivers of Romania
Rivers of Cluj County